Trevor Hatherton  (30 September 1924 – 2 May 1992) was a New Zealand geophysicist, scientific administrator and Antarctic scientist. He was born in Sharlston, Yorkshire, England, on 30 September 1924.

In the 1958 Queen's Birthday Honours, Hatherton was appointed an Officer of the Order of the British Empire.

References

1924 births
1992 deaths
New Zealand public servants
20th-century New Zealand geologists
People from Sharlston
British emigrants to New Zealand
Presidents of the Royal Society of New Zealand
New Zealand Officers of the Order of the British Empire
New Zealand Antarctic scientists